North York is an unincorporated community located in the town of Ashland, Ashland County, Wisconsin, United States. It is located on Wisconsin Highway 13.

Notes

Unincorporated communities in Ashland County, Wisconsin
Unincorporated communities in Wisconsin